C. cearensis may refer to:

 Canna cearensis, a garden plant
 Colobosauroides cearensis, a spectacled lizard
 Copaifera cearensis, a flowering plant
 Cyclopogon cearensis, a flowering plant